The Beretta A303 is a semi-automatic shotgun, developed by the Italian arms manufacturing company Fabbrica d'Armi Pietro Beretta.

Semi-automatic shotguns of Italy